William Jay Youmans (October 14, 1838 – April 10, 1901) was a United States scientist.  He edited Popular Science Monthly for a time.

Early life
He was born at Milton, New York.  He was the son of Vincent Youmans and Catherine (née Scofield) Youmans.  He worked on his father's farm and studied at the local school until he was 17.

He studied chemistry under his brother, Edward Livingston Youmans, and at Columbia and Yale, and studied natural history with Asa Fitch.  He then took a course in medicine at New York University, and in 1865 studied natural history under biologist Thomas Henry Huxley in London.

Career
On his return to the United States, Youmans settled at Winona, Minnesota, and practiced medicine for about three years.

In 1872, he abandoned his medical practice to assist his brother in establishing the Popular Science Monthly, and subsequently was associated in editing. After his brother's death in 1887, he became its editor-in-chief, remaining in that position until 1900.

He was a member of the American Association for the Advancement of Sciences.

Personal life
Youmans was married to Celia Greene of Gailway, New York, in 1866. Together, they had four children, including Dr. Vincent D. Youmans, Mary Youmans, Dr. Alice C. Youmans, and Edward Youmans.

Youmans died of typhoid fever at his home in Mount Vernon, New York.

Published works

He contributed occasionally to the pages of Popular Science Monthly under his own name, and for many years prepared the articles on chemistry, metallurgy, and physiology for Appletons' Annual Cyclopædia. He edited Huxley's 1866 work Lessons in Elementary Physiology, to which he added seven chapters on hygiene, and it became the 1868 work Elements of Physiology and Hygiene. He wrote Pioneers of Science in America (1895).

Notes

References
 
 

Attribution

External links
 
 
 

1838 births
1901 deaths
19th-century American chemists
American science writers
American magazine editors
Physicians from Minnesota
People from Milton, Saratoga County, New York
People from Winona, Minnesota
Writers from New York (state)
Writers from Minnesota
Columbia University alumni
Yale University alumni
New York University Grossman School of Medicine alumni
Scientists from New York (state)